Family Bank Limited (FBL), commonly known as Family Bank, is a commercial bank in Kenya, the largest economy in the East African Community. It is licensed by the Central Bank of Kenya, the central bank and national banking regulator.

Overview
Family Bank is a medium-sized commercial bank in Kenya. 
 the bank's total assets were valued at KSh69.12 billion (approximately US$696 million), with shareholders' equity of KSh11.75 billion (approximately US$118.3 million).

History
The bank was founded in 1984 as Family Finance Building Society Limited. Titus Muya, the former non-executive chairman of Family Bank served as the founding chairman and chief executive officer for the first twenty-three years of the organisation. In 2007, it became a commercial bank, following the issuance of a banking license by the Central Bank of Kenya, the country's banking regulator. Titus Muya resigned as CEO of the re-branded Family Bank Limited, to comply with current Kenyan banking regulations. Since converting to a commercial bank, FBL has been pursuing an expansion of its branch network.

In 2010, the bank diversified into the insurance industry through a subsidiary Dhamana Insurance Agency.

In 2013, the bank acquired a building in central Nairobi that serves as its headquarters and is currently undergoing renovation to carry its corporate image. This is the same building where founder Mr. TK Muya had rented a small space that served as both a branch and his office.

Ownership
The shares of stock of FBL are privately owned by institutional and individual investors. In October 2010, a consortium consisting of private equity firm AfricInvest, based in Tunisia, FMO of the Netherlands and Norway's Norfund, acquired a 25% stake in Family Bank for a cash sum of US$14.3 million. Two years later, that stake was sold to two Kenyan corporations, for an estimated price of US$21.3 million (KES:1.84 billion). The company shares are traded over-the-counter, with plans to list on the Nairobi Stock Exchange (NSE) in the future.

 the bank's shareholding was as follows:

Branch network
In February 2021, the bank opened its 92nd networked brick-and-mortar branch, in the Nairobi neighborhood called Eastleigh. At that time Family Bank maintained branches in 34 out of Kenya's 47 counties.

Governance
The chairman of the board of directors is Wilfred D. Kiboro, one of the non-executive directors. Rebecca Mbithi serves as the chief executive officer – designate.

See also

 List of banks in Kenya
 Central Bank of Kenya
 Economy of Kenya

References

External links
 Website of Family Bank
 Website of Central Bank of Kenya
 Rankings of Kenyan Commercial Banks By Assets 2009
  Peter Munyiri Takes Over As Family Bank CEO

Banks of Kenya
Banks established in 1984
Companies based in Nairobi
1984 establishments in Kenya